Siti Noor Radiah binti Ismail  (born 3 November 1993) is a Malaysian Paralympian who won a bronze medal at the 2016 Paralympic Games in Rio de Janeiro.

Honours and awards

Honours of Malaysia 
  :
  Member of the Order of the Defender of the Realm (AMN) (2017)
2016 Female Paralympian of the Year at the Malaysian Sports Awards.

References

External links
 
2016 Summer Paralympic- Rio 2016 profile

Paralympic athletes of Malaysia
Paralympic bronze medalists for Malaysia
Living people
1993 births
People from Johor
Medalists at the 2016 Summer Paralympics
Malaysian Muslims
Malaysian people of Malay descent
Track and field athletes with disabilities
Intellectual Disability category Paralympic competitors
Competitors in athletics with intellectual disability
Paralympic medalists in athletics (track and field)
Athletes (track and field) at the 2016 Summer Paralympics
Members of the Order of the Defender of the Realm
Malaysian long jumpers